The Egypt national junior handball team is the under-20s national team representing Egypt in the international handball competitions and is controlled by the Egyptian Handball Federation.

History
The Egypt junior handball team has participated in several junior's handball competitions and the first appearance was in the inaugural African Men's Junior Handball Championship in 1980 in Nigeria the team placed third, two years later in 1982 in Benin the Egyptian captured the first African and international title and have qualified to the 1983 IHF Men's Junior World Championship sow the first appearance was for good to gain experiences the Egyptian finished in the 13th rank.
In the African championship Egypt continued the domination that was normal for them but in the IHF Men's Junior World Championship they were still far from the strongest European team's level.
In 1993 Egypt was the host country.
The Egyptians exploited the home court advantage and found their way to the final match again the Denmark where they won it by 22–19 and then Egypt became the World Champions.

IHF Junior World Championship record

African Nations Championship record

Team

Notable players
Mohamed Nakib
Gohar Gohar
Abdou Ashraf
Mahmoud Marzouk 
Mahmoud Magdi 
Hussein Osman 
Radwan Mamdouh 
Shady sayed
Sayed Wael
Hegarzy Sherif 
Dawoud Hatem 
Hafez Mohi 
Serag El-Din Sherif 
El-Alfy Ayman 
Abdou Hazem 
Ibrahim Mohammed 
Abou El-Abbas Sherif

Notable coaches
 Gamal Shams

References

External links
Egyptian Handball 

Handball in Egypt
Men's national junior handball teams
National sports teams of Egypt